In mathematics and theoretical physics, Wigner's classification
is a classification of the nonnegative  energy irreducible unitary representations of the Poincaré group which have either finite or zero mass eigenvalues. (Since this group is noncompact, these unitary representations are infinite-dimensional.) It was introduced by Eugene Wigner, to classify particles and fields in physics—see the article particle physics and representation theory. It relies on the stabilizer subgroups of that group, dubbed the Wigner little groups of various mass states.

The eigenvalues of these operators serve to label the representations. The first is associated with mass-squared and the second with helicity or spin. 

The physically relevant representations may thus be classified according to whether
 
  but  or whether
  with 
Wigner found that massless particles are fundamentally different from massive particles.

In the ray interpretation, one can go over to Spin(3) instead. So, massive states are classified by an irreducible Spin(3) unitary representation that characterizes their spin, and a positive mass, .
 For the second case Look at the stabilizer of

This is the double cover of SE(2) (see projective representation). We have two cases, one where irreps are described by an integral multiple of  called the helicity, and the other called the "continuous spin" representation.
 For the third case The only finite-dimensional unitary solution is the trivial representation called the vacuum.

Massive scalar fields 

Let  be the hyperboloid sheet defined by:

  

The Poincare group  acts on  because (forgetting the action of the translation subgroup  with addition inside ) it preserves the Minkowski inner product, and an element  of the translation subgroup  of the Poincare group acts on

by multiplication by suitable phase multipliers

where  These two actions can be combined in a clever way using induced representations to obtain an action

This yields an action of the Poincare group on the space of square-integrable functions defined on the hypersurface  in Minkowski space. These may be viewed as measures defined on Minkowski space that are concentrated on the set  defined by

 

The Fourier transform (in all four variables) of such measures yields positive-energy, finite-energy solutions of the Klein–Gordon equation defined on Minkowski space, namely

without physical units. In this way, the  irreducible representation of the Poincare group is realized by its action on a suitable space of solutions of a linear wave equation.

The theory of projective representations
Physically, one is interested in irreducible projective unitary representations of the Poincaré group. After all, two vectors in the quantum Hilbert space that differ by multiplication by a constant represent the same physical state. Thus, two unitary operators that differ by a multiple of the identity have the same action on physical states. Therefore the unitary operators that represent Poincaré symmetry are only defined up to a constant—and therefore the group composition law need only hold up to a constant. 

According to Bargmann's theorem, every projective unitary representation of the Poincaré group comes from an ordinary unitary representation of its universal cover, which is a double cover. (Bargmann's theorem applies because the double cover of the Poincaré group admits no non-trivial one-dimensional central extensions.) 

Passing to the double cover is important because it allows for half-odd-integer spin cases. In the positive mass case, for example, the little group is SU(2) rather than SO(3); the representations of SU(2) then include both integer and half-odd-integer spin cases.

Since the general criterion in Bargmann's theorem was not known when Wigner did his classification, he needed to show by hand (§5 of the paper) that the phases can be chosen in the operators to reflect the composition law in the group, up to a sign, which is then accounted for by passing to the double cover of the Poincaré group.

Further classification
Left out from this classification are tachyonic solutions, solutions with no fixed mass, infraparticles with no fixed mass, etc. Such solutions are of physical importance, when considering virtual states. A celebrated example is the case of deep inelastic scattering, in which a virtual space-like photon is exchanged between the incoming lepton and the incoming hadron. This justifies the introduction of transversely and longitudinally-polarized photons, and of the related concept of transverse and longitudinal structure functions, when considering these virtual states as effective probes of the internal quark and gluon contents of the hadrons. From a mathematical point of view, one considers the SO(2,1) group instead of the usual SO(3) group encountered in the usual massive case discussed above. This explains the occurrence of two transverse polarization vectors  and 

See also
Induced representation
Representation theory of the diffeomorphism group
Representation theory of the Galilean group
Representation theory of the Poincaré group
System of imprimitivity
Pauli–Lubanski pseudovector

References 

Representation theory of Lie groups
Quantum field theory
Mathematical physics